Where We Belong may refer to:

Books
Where We Belong (novel), 2012 chick-lit novel by Emily Giffin
Where We Belong, environmental book by Paul Shepard
"Where We Belong, A Duet", poem by Maya Angelou from collection And Still I Rise

Film
Where We Belong, 2011 Ugandan film directed by Mariam Ndagire
Where We Belong, 2019 Thai film directed by Kongdej Jaturanrasamee

Music
Where We Belong (album), 1998 album by Boyzone
Where We Belong, 1990 album by Kenyan band Them Mushrooms
Where We Belong, 2003 album by Swedish artist Rasmus Faber

Songs
"Where We Belong" (Lostprophets song), 2010 song by UK band Lostprophets from the album The Betrayed
"Where We Belong", 1999 single by Hot Water Music on the EP Moonpies for Misfits
"Where We Belong", 2003 song by Westlife
"Where We Belong", 2003 song by Rasmus Faber
"Where We Belong", 2006 song by DeYarmond Edison
"Where We Belong", 2007 song written by Kate Alexa from DNA Songs 
"Where We Belong", 2010 song by Thriving Ivory from Through Yourself & Back Again
"Where We Belong", 2012 song by Devin Townsend from the album Epicloud
"Where We Belong", 2013 song by Fedde le Grand and Di-rect
"Where We Belong", song by Reuben Morgan and Joel Davies from the 2008 album This Is Our God
"Where We Belong", song by Sanctus Real from album Pieces of Our Past: The Sanctus Real Anthology

See also
"Up Where We Belong", song by Joe Cocker and Jennifer Warnes in the 1982 film An Officer and a Gentleman
"We All Go Back to Where We Belong, 2011 song by R.E.M.
Where We All Belong, album by The Marshall Tucker Band